The "" ("Horst Wessel Song"), also known by its opening words "" ("Raise the Flag"), was the anthem of the Nazi Party (NSDAP) from 1930 to 1945. From 1933 to 1945, the Nazis made it the co-national anthem of Germany, along with the first stanza of the "".

The "" has been banned in Germany and Austria since the end of World War II.

History

The lyrics to "Horst-Wessel-Lied" were written in 1929 by Sturmführer Horst Wessel, the commander of the Nazi paramilitary "Brownshirts" (Sturmabteilung or "SA") in the Friedrichshain district of Berlin. Wessel wrote songs for the SA in conscious imitation of the Communist paramilitary, the Red Front Fighters' League, to provoke them into attacking his troops, and to keep up the spirits of his men.

Horst Wessel
Wessel was the son of a pastor and educated at degree level, but was employed as a construction worker. He became notorious among the Communists when he led a number of SA attacks into the Fischerkiez, an extremely poor Berlin district, which he did on orders from Joseph Goebbels, who was then the Nazi Gauleiter (regional party leader) of Berlin. Several of these incursions were only minor altercations, but one took place outside the tavern which the local German Communist Party (KPD) used as its headquarters. As a result of that melee, five Communists were injured, four of them seriously. Communist newspapers accused the police of letting the Nazis get away while arresting the injured Communists, while Nazi newspapers claimed that Wessel had been trying to give a speech when Communists emerged and started the fight. Wessel's face was printed together with his address on Communist street posters. The slogan of the KPD and the Red Front Fighters' League became "strike the fascists wherever you find them."

Wessel moved with his partner Erna Jänicke into a room on Große Frankfurter Straße. The landlady was the widowed Mrs Salm, whose husband had been a Communist. After a few months, there was a dispute between Salm and Wessel over unpaid rent. Salm requested Wessel's partner to leave but Jänicke refused. Salm appealed to Communist friends of her late husband for help. Shortly thereafter on 14 January 1930, Wessel was shot and seriously wounded by two Communist Party members, one of whom was Albrecht "Ali" Höhler. Wessel died in hospital on 23 February from blood poisoning, which he contracted during his hospitalisation. Höhler was tried in court and sentenced to six years' imprisonment for the shooting. He was taken out of prison under false pretenses by the SA and shot dead three years later, after the Nazi accession to national power in 1933.

Nazi Party anthem
Joseph Goebbels, the Nazi Gauleiter and owner and editor of the newspaper Der Angriff (The Attack), had made several attempts to create Nazi martyrs for propaganda purposes, the first being an SA man named Hans-Georg Kütemeyer, whose body was pulled out of a canal the morning after he attended a speech by Hitler at the Sportpalast. Goebbels attempted to spin this into an assassination by Communists, but the overwhelming evidence showed it to have been suicide, and he had to drop the matter. Thus, Goebbels put considerable effort into mythologizing Wessel's story, even as the man lay dying. He met with Wessel's mother, who told him her son's life story, his hope for a "better world", and his attempt to rescue a prostitute he had met on the street. Goebbels saw Wessel as an "idealistic dreamer".

Wessel himself had undergone an operation at St. Joseph's Hospital which stopped his internal bleeding, but the surgeons had been unable to remove the bullet in his cerebellum. Wessel was brought to his mother's home to die. In his diary, Goebbels described Wessel's entire face as being shot up and his features distorted, and claimed that Wessel told him "One has to keep going! I'm happy!" After a period where his condition stabilized, Wessel died on 23 February.

Goebbels consulted Hermann Göring and others in the party on how to respond to Wessel's death. They declared a period of mourning until 12 March, during which party and SA members would avoid amusements and Wessel's name would be invoked at all party meetings. Wessel's unit was renamed the Horst Wessel Storm Unit 5.

From a mashup of fact and fiction, Goebbels' propaganda created what became one of the Nazi Party's central martyr-figures of their movement. He officially declared Wessel's march, renamed as the "" ("Horst Wessel Song"), to be the Nazi Party anthem, which aided in promoting Wessel as the first of many in the Nazi cult of martyrdom. Wessel was buried on 1 March 1930. Contrary to Nazi claims, there were no attacks on the funeral procession. His funeral was filmed and turned into a major propaganda event by the NSDAP. The "Horst Wessel Song" was sung by the SA at the funeral, and was thereafter extensively used at party functions, as well as sung by the SA during street parades.

Co-national anthem
When Adolf Hitler became the Chancellor of Germany in January 1933, the "Horst Wessel Song" became a national symbol by law on 19 May 1933. The following year, a regulation required the right arm be extended and raised in the "Hitler salute" when the (identical) first and fourth verses were sung. Nazi leaders can be seen singing the song at the finale of Leni Riefenstahl's 1935 film Triumph of the Will. Hitler also mandated the tempo at which the song had to be played.

Some Nazis were extremely sensitive about the uses to which the "Horst Wessel Song" was put. For instance, a bandleader who wrote a jazz version of the song was forced to leave Germany, and when Martha Dodd, the daughter of William E. Dodd, at the time the US ambassador to Germany, played a recording of an unusual arrangement of the song at her birthday party at the Ambassador's residence in 1933, a young Nazi who was a liaison between the German Foreign Ministry and Hitler's Chancellery, turned off the record player, announcing "This is not the sort of music to be played for mixed gatherings and in a flippant manner." The song was played in some Protestant places of worship, as some elements of the Protestant Church in Germany had accepted the Horst Wessel cult, built as it was by Goebbels on the model of Christian martyrs of the past.

Post World War II
With the end of the Nazi regime in May 1945, the "Horst Wessel Song" was banned. The lyrics and tune are now illegal in Germany, with some limited exceptions. In early 2011, this resulted in a Lower Saxony State Police investigation of Amazon.com and Apple Inc. for offering the song for sale on their websites. Both Apple and Amazon complied with the government's request, and deleted the song from their offerings.

A special marine commando unit within the Chilean Navy uses the same melody as the Horst-Wessel-Lied with different lyrics called "Himno de la Agrupación de Comandos IM no. 51".

Lyrics 

The words to the "Horst Wessel Song" were published in September 1929 in the Nazi Party's Berlin newspaper, Der Angriff (The Attack) which Joseph Goebbels owned and ran.

Die Fahne hoch! Die Reihen fest geschlossen!
SA marschiert mit ruhig festem Schritt.
Kam'raden, die Rotfront und Reaktion erschossen,
Marschier'n im Geist in unser'n Reihen mit.

Die Straße frei den braunen Bataillonen.
Die Straße frei dem Sturmabteilungsmann!
Es schau'n aufs Hakenkreuz voll Hoffnung schon Millionen.
Der Tag für Freiheit und für Brot bricht an!

Zum letzten Mal wird Sturmalarm geblasen!
Zum Kampfe steh'n wir alle schon bereit!
Schon flattern Hitlerfahnen über allen Straßen.
Die Knechtschaft dauert nur noch kurze Zeit!

(repeat first stanza)
Raise the flag! The ranks tightly closed!
The SA marches with calm, steady step.
Comrades shot by the Red Front and reactionaries
March in spirit within our ranks.

Clear the streets for the brown battalions,
Clear the streets for the storm division man!
Millions are looking upon the hooked-cross full of hope,
The day of freedom and of bread dawns!

For the last time, the call to arms is sounded!
For the fight, we all stand prepared!
Already Hitler's banners fly over all streets.
The time of bondage will last but a little while now!

The Rotfront, or "Red Front", was the Rotfrontkämpferbund, the paramilitary organization of the Communist Party of Germany. The Nazi SA, also known as the "brown shirts" and the Communist Red Front fought each other in violent street confrontations, which grew into almost open warfare after 1930. The "reactionaries" were the conservative political parties and the liberal democratic German government of the Weimar Republic period, which made several unsuccessful attempts to suppress the SA. The "time of bondage" refers to the period after the 1919 Treaty of Versailles, in which the victorious powers imposed huge reparations on Germany, stripped her of her colonies in Africa, Asia and the Pacific Ocean, some of which became League of Nations mandates, gave parts of Germany to Belgium, Denmark, France, Poland, and Lithuania, and occupied the Rhineland.

The line  is technically ambiguous. It could either mean Kameraden, die von Rotfront und Reaktion erschossen wurden ("Our comrades who were shot dead by the Red Front and Reactionaries") or Kameraden, welche die Erschießung von Rotfront und Reaktion durchführten ("Our comrades who have shot the Red Front and Reactionaries dead"). In spite of this obvious syntactic problem, which was mentioned by Victor Klemperer in his LTI – Lingua Tertii Imperii, the line was never changed. The following line  (March in spirit within our ranks) however indicates that the aforementioned comrades are deceased, advocating the first interpretation.

Some changes were made to the lyrics after Wessel's death:

After Wessel's death, new stanzas were added, composed in his honour. These were frequently sung by the SA but did not become part of the official lyrics used on party or state occasions.

Melody
After Wessel's death, he was officially credited with having composed the music as well as having written the lyrics for the "Horst Wessel Song". Between 1930 and 1933, however, German critics disputed this, pointing out that the melody had a long history. "How Great Thou Art" is a well-known hymn of Swedish origin with a similar tune for example. Criticism of Horst Wessel as author became unthinkable after 1933, when the Nazi Party took control of Germany and criticism would likely be met with severe punishment.

The most likely immediate source for the melody was a song popular in the Imperial German Navy during World War I, which Wessel would no doubt have heard being sung by World War I veterans in the Berlin of the 1920s. The opening stanza of the song is:

In 1936, the German music critic Alfred Weidemann published an article, in which he identified the melody of a song composed in 1865 by Peter Cornelius as the "Urmelodie" (source-melody). According to Weidemann, Cornelius described the tune as a "Viennese folk tune". This appeared to him to be the ultimate origin of the melody of the "Horst Wessel Song".

Far-right use outside Germany
During the 1930s and 1940s, the "Horst Wessel Song" was adapted by fascist groups in other European countries.

British Union of Fascists

One of the marching songs of the British Union of Fascists, known as The Marching Song or Comrades, the Voices was set to the same tune, and its lyrics were to some extent modelled on the song, though appealing to British Fascism. Instead of referring to martyrs of the party, it identifies Britain's war dead as those marching in spirit against the "red front and massed ranks of reaction".

Comrades, the voices of the dead battalions,
Of those who fell, that Britain might be great,
𝄆 Join in our song, for they still march in spirit with us,
And urge us on to gain the fascist state! 𝄇

We're of their blood, And spirit of their spirit,
Sprung from that soil, for whose dear sake they bled,
𝄆 Against vested powers, Red Front, and massed ranks of reaction,
We lead the fight for freedom and for bread! 𝄇

The streets are still, the final struggle's ended;
Flushed with the fight, we proudly hail the dawn!
𝄆 See, over all the streets, the fascist banners waving,
Triumphant standards of our race reborn! 𝄇

Croatian Fascists 
In modern Croatia, members of various far-right movements consider the adaptation written by Jan Zadravec, called "Hrvatski Stijeg" (The Croatian Banner), to be their unofficial anthem.

Falange fascist movement
In Spain, the Falange fascist movement sang Camisa azul to the same tune:

(Note that this was a traditional Falange march, not a march of the original Falange. It was sung by some of the volunteers of the 250th division, the División Azul, after the death of José Antonio Primo de Rivera.)

Legion of French Volunteers Against Bolshevism
In Vichy France the members of the Légion des volontaires français sang:

Golden Dawn
In modern Greece, Golden Dawn, an extreme right-wing party, uses the "Horst Wessel Song" with Greek lyrics in its gatherings or events such as the occasional public distribution of food "to Greeks only", while its leader, Nikolaos Michaloliakos, often uses the song's key stanzas (e.g. "The flags on high!") in his speeches.

The lyrics of their version are:

All-Russian Fascist Organisation

The All-Russian Fascist Organisation, founded in 1933, largely consisted of émigrés of the White Movement. It was led by Anastasy Vonsiatsky and was based in Connecticut, USA. The organisation dissolved after the United States entered World War II. Vonsyatsky was arrested for violating the 1917 Espionage Act.

The lyrics of their version are:

Patriotic People's Movement
The fascist Lapua Movement and its successor Patriotic People's Movement of Finland sang a song to the tune of Horst Wessel Lied, translated by Otto Al’Antila:

Parodies

Before 1933, the German Communists and the Social Democrats sang parodies of the "Horst Wessel Song" during their street battles with the SA. Some versions simply changed the political character of the song:

Der Stahlhelm, or "The Steel Helmet", was a nationalist veterans' organisation closely aligned with the German National People's Party.

The Communist Party of Germany substituted completely new lyrics:

Ernst Thälmann was the KPD leader.

These versions were banned once the Nazis came to power and the Communist and Social Democratic parties prohibited. However, during the years of the Third Reich the song was parodied in underground versions, poking fun at the corruption of the Nazi elite. There are similarities between different texts as underground authors developed them with variations. Below are several versions.

Wilhelm Frick was the Interior Minister, Baldur von Schirach was the Hitler Youth leader and Heinrich Himmler was head of the SS and police.

Another version was:
Die Preise hoch, die Schnauze fest geschlossen,
Hunger marschiert in ruhig festem Schritt.
Hitler und Göbbels, uns're beiden Volksgenossen,
Hungern im Geist mit uns Proleten mit.

Im Arbeitsamt wird SOS geblasen,
Zum Stempeln steh'n wir alle Mann bereit.
Statt Brot und Arbeit gibt der Führer uns nur Phrasen,
Und wer was sagt, lebt nur noch kurze Zeit.

Die Straße stinkt nach braunen Batallionen,
Ein Pöstchen winkt dem Sturmabteilungsmann.
Vielleicht verdient als Bonze morgen er Millionen,
Doch das geht uns 'nen braunen Scheißdreck an!
The prices high, the snouts firmly closed,
Hunger marches with a quiet, steady step.
Hitler and Göbbels, our two comrades,
Starve in spirit along with us proles.

In the unemployment benefits office SOS is sounded,
All we men stand prepared to register as unemployed.
Instead of bread and work, the Führer gives us just phrases,
And whoever says anything lives but a little while.

The street stinks of the brown battalions,
A cushy job winks at the Stormtrooper.
Perhaps tomorrow he'll be a fat cat and get millions,
But that means jack-shit to us.

In the first year of Nazi rule radical elements of the SA sang their own parody of the song, reflecting their disappointment that the socialist element of National Socialism had not been realised:

Kurt Schmitt was Economics Minister between 1933 and 1935.

One of the best-known parodies was included in Bertolt Brecht's play Schweik in the Second World War (1943). Hanns Eisler composed a score for the "Kälbermarsch" (Calves' March):

After Nazi Germany's capitulation on 8 May 1945, which ended World War II, as well as Germany's occupation of Eastern Europe, Germany was divided into four occupation zones (British, French, US-American and Soviet). In the Soviet zone, a version of 'Die Preise hoch' became popular, targeting Communist functionaries:

The most notable English-language parody was written by Oliver Wallace to a similar melody and titled "Der Fuehrer's Face" for the 1942 Donald Duck cartoon of the same name. It was the first hit record for Spike Jones. The opening lyrics give the flavor of the song:

When der Fuehrer says we is de master race
We "Heil!" (pffft), "Heil!" (pffft) right in der Fuehrer's face
Not to love der Fuehrer is a great disgrace
So we "Heil!" (pffft), "Heil!" (pffft) right in der Fuehrer's face

Each "Heil!" is followed by a Bronx cheer.

In popular culture
The New York Youth Symphony, after it discovered that a piece it had commissioned included a 45-second musical quote of the "Horst Wessel Song", abruptly canceled a Carnegie Hall performance of Marsh u Nebuttya (Ukrainian: "March to Oblivion"), a 9-minute piece composed by Estonian-born Jonas Tarm, a 21-year-old junior at the New England Conservatory of Music. The composer would not explain his purpose in using the song in his piece, saying "[I]t can speak for itself", but the orchestra said that the usage was not appropriate.
German composer Karlheinz Stockhausen's electronic and concrete work titled, Hymnen includes a sample recording of the "Horst Wessel Song". It premiered in Cologne, Germany, on 30 November 1967. It was also performed in New York's Philharmonic Hall (now David Geffen Hall) and London's English Bach Festival among other international performances.
The tune is used in Lukas Foss' Elegy for Anne Frank (1989) as a contorted march about three-quarters of the way through the work. This leads to an abrupt silence after which the earlier theme returns.
The neofolk band Death in June released a recording of the "Horst Wessel Song" under the name "Brown Book" on their 1987 album of the same name.
The title theme for Wolfenstein 3D has a rendition of the "Horst-Wessel-Lied", recomposed by Bobby Prince and released for DOS on 5 May 1992.
In the Video Game Return to Castle Wolfenstein the song is played from radios in several locations in the game. The radios can be destroyed to stop the song playing.
In 2003, a high school marching band from Paris, Texas, played the "Horst-Wessel-Lied" while waving a Nazi flag at a football match at Hillcrest High School in Dallas. The performance coincided with the Jewish holiday of Rosh Hashanah. The performance, which was meant to symbolize the history of World War II and also included musical selections and flags from Japan, France, the United Kingdom, and the United States, was greeted with boos from the audience which threw objects at the band. The school superintendent apologized to the Dallas school district and removed the flag from future performances of the composition.

See also

 "Giovinezza", hymn of the Italian National Fascist Party
 "Cara al Sol", anthem of the fascist Spanish Falange
 "Maréchal, nous voilà !", unofficial anthem of unoccupied Vichy France
 Music in Nazi Germany
 Nazi songs
 German laws against modern use of Nazi songs
 "Sturmlied"
 "Vorwärts! Vorwärts!", anthem of the Hitler Youth

References
Notes

Bibliography

Further reading
Boderick, George. "Das Horst-Wessel-Lied: A Reappraisal", International Folklore Review, vol. 10 (1995): 100–127.

External links

Text and melody (MIDI format), song (MP3 format), song (OGG format)
Text of the German Criminal Code – Section 86 and Section 86a (in English)

1930 songs
Horst Wessel
Nazi songs
Symbols of Nazi Germany
Nazi symbolism
Fascist symbols
Historical national anthems